Rotten may refer to:
 Axl Rotten, ring name of American professional wrestler Brian Knighton (1971–2016)
 Bonnie Rotten, American former pornographic actress, feature dancer, fetish model, and director
 Ian Rotten, ring name of American professional wrestler John Benson Williams (born 1970)
 Johnny Rotten, former stage name of John Lydon (born 1956), British musician, lead singer of the Sex Pistols and Public Image Ltd
 Rotten, a German name of the river Rhône
Rotten (TV series), a 2018 documentary television series
“Rotten”, a 2017 song by Zomboy from Rott N’ Roll, Pt. 1

See also
 Rot (disambiguation)
 Roton (disambiguation)
 Biodegradation, the process of rotting
 Rotten.com, a United States-hosted shock site
 Robbie Rotten, a character on the Icelandic children's television show LazyTown